"九龍" ('nine dragons') most often refers to Kowloon, an urban area in Hong Kong.

"九龍" may also refer to:

Other places
Cloudy Hill, a hill in Hong Kong
Cửu Long Province, a former province in southern Vietnam
Guryong Station, in South Korea
Kuroshima and Taijima, islands inJapan

People
Kūron Oshiro (尾城九龍), a Japanese music composer and arranger

See also
 Jiulong (disambiguation), for articles on places using the pinyin variant of this name
 Kowloon (disambiguation), for articles referring to areas related to Kowloon

zh:九龍 (消歧義)